Sidikou is a surname. Notable people with the surname include:

Abdou Sidikou (1927–1973), Nigerian politician and diplomat
Fatima Djibo Sidikou, Nigerien diplomat
Maman Sambo Sidikou (born 1949), Nigerian politician and diplomat
Oumarou Sidikou (1937?–2005), Nigerian politician